Timoteo Pérez Vargas, O.C.D. (1595 – 5 April 1651) was a Roman Catholic prelate who served as the first Bishop of Baghdad (1633–1639) and the second Bishop of Ispahan (1632–1639).

Biography
Timoteo Pérez Vargas was born in Palermo, Italy and was ordained a priest in the Order of Discalced Carmelites on 8 June 1612. 6 September 1632 he was selected by the King of Spain and confirmed by Pope Urban VIII as Coadjutor Bishop of Ispahan. On 6 September 1632 he was selected by the King of Spain and confirmed by Pope Urban VIII as Bishop of Baghdad. On 19 September  1632 he was consecrated bishop by Bernardino Spada, Cardinal-Priest Santo Stefano al Monte Celio. On 5 September 1633 he succeeded to the Bishopric of Ispahan. On 23 December 1639 he resigned as Bishop of Baghdad and as Bishop of Ispahan and was appointed Titular Bishop of Lystra. He died on 5 April 1651.

Episcopal succession

References 

1595 births
1651 deaths
17th-century Roman Catholic bishops in Safavid Iran
Bishops appointed by Pope Urban VIII
Discalced Carmelite bishops
Clergy from Palermo